Union Methodist Episcopal Church and variations may refer to:

Union Bethel African Methodist Episcopal Church (Great Falls, Montana), listed on the NRHP in Montana
Union Methodist Episcopal Church (Philadelphia, Pennsylvania), listed on the NRHP in Pennsylvania
Union Avenue Methodist Episcopal Church, South, Memphis, TN, listed on the NRHP in Tennessee